Mahmoud Moustafa Fathalla (born 16 May 1958) is an Egyptian wrestler. He competed in the men's Greco-Roman 52 kg at the 1984 Summer Olympics.

References

1958 births
Living people
Egyptian male sport wrestlers
Olympic wrestlers of Egypt
Wrestlers at the 1984 Summer Olympics
Place of birth missing (living people)